is a very small, monolithic asteroid and fast rotator, classified as a near-Earth object of the Apollo group, approximately  in diameter. It was first observed on 5 January 2001, by astronomers of the LINEAR program at Lincoln Laboratory's Experimental Test Site near Socorro, New Mexico, in the United States. The presumed S-type asteroid has a rotation period of only 10 minutes. It has an exceptionally low MOID of 0.66 lunar distance (LD) and will approach Earth at 0.81 LD on 11 November 2029.

Orbit and classification 

 is a member of the dynamical Apollo group, which are Earth-crossing asteroids. Apollo asteroids are the largest subgroup of near-Earth objects. Unlike many Apollo asteroids, this asteroid is not a Mars-crosser, as its aphelion is smaller than the orbit of the Red Planet at 1.66 AU.

This asteroid orbits the Sun at a distance of 0.97–1.59 AU once every 17 months (531 days; semi-major axis of 1.28 AU). Its orbit has an eccentricity of 0.24 and an inclination of 0° with respect to the ecliptic. The body's observation arc begins with a precovery found in ESO's Astrovirtel data archive , in August 2000, less than 5 months prior to its official discovery observation at Socorro.

Close approaches 

Due to its small size, that is, an absolute magnitude fainter than 22, this asteroid is not classified as a potentially hazardous asteroid.

On 18 November 2013, the asteroid passed Earth at 2.7 LD. The angle of approach made it a good target for radar observations.

It will also pass the Moon at an even shorter nominal distance of

Physical characteristics

 is an assumed stony S-type asteroid.

Rotation period 

Lightcurve analysis gave a rotation period of 0.1701 hours (612 second) with a brightness amplitude of 0.26 magnitude. With such a short period, it is a notable fast rotator. The observers classified it as a "monolithic fast-rotating asteroid" (MFRA).

Diameter and albedo 

The Collaborative Asteroid Lightcurve Link assumes a standard albedo for stony asteroids of 0.20 and derives a diameter of 0.03 kilometers based on an absolute magnitude of 24.9.

Numbering and naming 

As of 2018, this minor planet has neither been numbered nor named.

References

External links 
 Table of Asteroids Next Closest Approaches to the Earth, Sormano Astronomical Observatory
 Asteroid Lightcurve Database (LCDB), query form (info )
 Asteroids and comets rotation curves, CdR – Observatoire de Genève, Raoul Behrend
 Forthcoming Close Approaches To The Earth – Minor Planet Center
 
 
 

Minor planet object articles (unnumbered)

20010105